Sufnersee is a reservoir between Splügen and Sufers on the Hinterrhein river in the Grisons, Switzerland. The dam Sufers was built 1962. The reservoir has a volume of 17.5 million m³ and its surface area is 0.90 km².

See also
List of lakes of Switzerland
List of mountain lakes of Switzerland

External links 
 

Lakes of Graubünden
Reservoirs in Switzerland
RSufnersee
Rheinwald
Sufers